The Holyrood Santa Fe Depot, located between Main Street and Smith Street in Holyrood, Kansas, United States.

History
It was built in 1887, then listed on the National Register of Historic Places in 2010.

A restoration project was ongoing in December 2016.

References

Railway stations on the National Register of Historic Places in Kansas
Victorian architecture in Kansas
Railway stations in the United States opened in 1887
National Register of Historic Places in Ellsworth County, Kansas
Atchison, Topeka and Santa Fe Railway stations